Coptotriche discreta is a moth of the family Tischeriidae. It was described by Annette Frances Braun in 1972. It is found on Santa Cruz Island in the US state of California.

The larvae feed on Quercus agrifolia, Quercus chrysolepis, Quercus suber and Quercus wislizenii. They mine the leaves of their host plant.

References

Moths described in 1972
Tischeriidae